Air Chief Marshal Sir Peter Ted Squire,  (7 October 1945 – 19 February 2018) was a senior Royal Air Force officer. He was a fast jet pilot in the 1970s, a squadron commander during the Falklands War, and a senior air commander in the 1990s. Squire served as Chief of the Air Staff from 2000 to 2003. In retirement he was the chairman of the board of trustees of the Imperial War Museum and vice-chairman of the board of the Commonwealth War Graves Commission.

Early life
Peter Squire was born at Felixstowe, Suffolk, on 7 October 1945, the son of Wing Commander Frank Squire, D.S.O., D.F.C., who was the son of a Devon farmer, and Margaret Pascoe Squire (née Trump). He received his schooling at the independent King's School, Bruton in Somerset, the fees of which were paid for by the British Government as he was the son of a serving military commissioned officer.

Military career
In 1961, at the age of sixteen Squire was awarded a scholarship to academically study at RAF College Cranwell, which he entered in 1963. He received a commission into the Royal Air Force with the rank of Pilot Officer on 15 July 1966. He was promoted to flying officer on 15 January 1967, and sent to No. 20 Squadron based in Singapore to fly Hunters in 1968. He was promoted to flight lieutenant on 15 January 1969, and joined No. 4 Flying Training School in Anglesey in 1970.

In 1973 he commanded the R.A.F.'s display squadron "The Red Arrows", and was awarded the Queen's Commendation for Valuable Service in the Air in the 1973 Birthday Honours, and having been promoted to squadron leader on 1 July 1973, flew Harriers with No. 3 Squadron in West Germany from 1975. He was awarded the Air Force Cross in the 1979 Birthday Honours. 
Promoted to wing commander on 1 July 1980, 

Squire was appointed commanding officer of No. 1 (F) Squadron based at RAF Wittering flying Harrier GR3's in 1981. In 1982, he commanded the squadron in action in the Falklands War. He flew with the squadron to CFB Goose Bay in Canada on 13 April 1982, on a six-hour flight using air-to-air refuelling for an exercise. The squadron departed for the Falklands on 3 May 1982 from RAF St Mawgan, flying to RAF Ascension Island, where a few days later it boarded the merchant transport ship . No.1 (F) Squadron was the first R.A.F. unit to operate in a combat role from a British aircraft carrier since the World War II. 

With No.1 (F) Squadron R.A.F. assigned to a ground-attack role in the conflict, Squire personally flew twenty four sorties against Argentine positions in support of British Army and Royal Marines operations on West Falkland and East Falkland. During one attack a 7.62mm bullet fired from the ground penetrated his harrier's cockpit. On 8 June 1982 he suffered an engine failure whilst landing at a forward operating base behind British lines at San Carlos and crashed the aircraft, walking away uninjured. On 13 June 1982 he was the first R.A.F. pilot to drop a laser-guided bomb in action during fighting at Mount Longdon, for which he was awarded the Distinguished Flying Cross. Four Harriers from No.1 (F) Squadron of its ten combat strength were lost during the war, three to enemy ground fire, and one (piloted by Squire) through engine failure whilst in flight. 

After the war, whilst still in the Falklands, on 6 November 1982 Squire again suffered engine failure whilst out on a routine patrol, and was forced to eject from the aircraft at low altitude near Cape Pembroke, being rescued from the sea uninjured by a Royal Navy helicopter. On return to the United Kingdom he became leader of the R.A.F.'s 'Command Briefing and Presentation Team', and subsequently went on to be Personal Staff Officer to the Air Officer Commanding RAF Strike Command in 1984. Promoted to group captain on 1 July 1985, he took up the appointment of Station Commander of RAF Cottesmore in 1986.

He was appointed to the post of Director Air Offensive at the Ministry of Defence in 1989. Following his promotion to air commodore on 1 January 1990, he became senior air staff officer at H.Q. 'Strike Command' and Deputy Chief of Staff Operations (United Kingdom) Air Forces in 1991 and received further promotion to air vice-marshal on 1 July 1991. He was appointed Air Officer Commanding No. 1 Group in February 1993, however, after only a few months he was replaced by Air Vice Marshal John Day. He served as Assistant Chief of the Air Staff from 1994 and, having been promoted to air marshal on 9 February 1996, became Deputy Chief of the Defence Staff (Programmes and Personnel) in 1996. 

He was appointed Knight Commander of the Order of the Bath in the 1997 Birthday Honours. Appointed Air Aide-de-Camp to The Queen on 29 March 1999, he was promoted to air chief marshal, and became Commander-in-Chief RAF Strike Command, and Commander Allied Air Forces Northwestern Europe on 30 March 1999.

In 2000 he became Chief of the Air Staff, and was advanced to Knight Grand Cross of the Order of the Bath in the 2001 New Year Honours. As Chief of the Air Staff he advised the British Government on the British air contribution to Operation Veritas in Afghanistan in 2001, and then to Operation Telic in Iraq. He retired on 5 December 2003.

Later life
In retirement Squire joined the Royal Air Force Volunteer Reserve. He was chairman of the board of trustees of the Imperial War Museum from 2003 to 2011, and vice-chairman of the board of the Commonwealth War Graves Commission from 2005 to 2008. He was also a governor at King's School, Bruton, and the deputy lieutenant of Devon. In 2004 he privately issued a narrative of the combat operations by No.1 (F) Squadron in the Falklands in 1982, entitled 'The Harrier Goes to War'. In 2005 he recorded an extended interview detailing his military career with the Imperial War Museum's Sound Archive.

He died of heart failure at the age of 72 on 19 February 2018 at his home, "Lower Park", at Gidleigh in Devon. A funeral service was held at Holy Trinity Church, Gidleigh in early March 2018. A memorial service was held for him at St Clement Danes Church in London on 1 June 2018, the Queen being represented by Lord Craig of Radley.

Personal life
In 1970 he married Carolyn Joynson, the marriage producing three sons. His main personal interest was golf.

Arms

References

External links
 The air combat in the Falklands War

|-

|-

|-

|-

|-

|-

|-

1945 births
2018 deaths
Royal Air Force air marshals
Recipients of the Commendation for Valuable Service in the Air
Chiefs of the Air Staff (United Kingdom)
Royal Air Force personnel of the Falklands War
Falklands War pilots
Knights Grand Cross of the Order of the Bath
Recipients of the Distinguished Flying Cross (United Kingdom)
Recipients of the Air Force Cross (United Kingdom)
Graduates of the Royal Air Force College Cranwell
People educated at King's School, Bruton
Fellows of the Royal Aeronautical Society
Deputy Lieutenants of Devon
Military personnel from Suffolk